Yigal Carmon (Hebrew יגאל כרמון) (born 1946) is the president and cofounder of the Middle East Media Research Institute (MEMRI), an organization which monitors and translates Arabic and Persian publications; radio and TV broadcasts; and religious sermons into many languages and circulates them over the Internet.

Carmon was a colonel at Aman, the Israeli military intelligence service, and later counter-terrorism advisor to Israeli prime ministers Yitzhak Rabin and Yitzhak Shamir.

Biography
Yigal Carmon was born in Romania in 1946 and immigrated to Israel with his family at age four. He grew up in Hadera. In high school, he began to study Arabic, and eventually achieved native-level fluency. At age 18, he had his conscription to the Israel Defense Forces deferred so he could study as part of the Atuda program. After earning a degree in Orientalism from the Hebrew University of Jerusalem, he joined the IDF in 1968 and served in the Intelligence Corps until 1988, reaching the rank of Colonel. 

From 1977 to 1981, he served as an adviser on Arab affairs to the Civil Administration in the West Bank and Gaza Strip. When Menachem Milson was appointed to serve as head of the Civil Administration, Carmon was appointed his deputy. After Milson resigned in September 1982, Carmon served as acting head of the Civil Administration until Shlomo Ilya was appointed to the position in 1983.

In 1988, Carmon was appointed adviser on counterterrorism for Prime Minister Yitzhak Shamir. Following the fall of the Shamir government in 1992, he served for a year as Prime Minister Yitzhak Rabin's counterterrorism adviser before resigning in 1993 due to his opposition to the Oslo Accords.  From 1991 to 1992 he was also a part of the Israeli delegation to peace negotiations with Syria in Washington.
 
In 1998, Carmon founded MEMRI.

Carmon has also testified before the US Congress and European parliaments.

Views

On reporting "difficult realities"
According to Ruthie Blum, writing in the Jerusalem Post, Carmon and MEMRI's translations of material appearing in the Arabic and Persian media, "have been received with a combination of angst and ambivalence on the part of the press and politicians who don't like what they're seeing."

Carmon relates that his experience of portraying difficult realities in the Arab-Muslim world: "In 1994-5, before MEMRI was formally established, I taped TV broadcasts of [ Palestinian Authority chairman] Arafat calling for jihad. The reaction to that tape was: 'Kill the messenger'...And I protested by saying, 'But it's not me [calling for jihad]; it's him [Arafat].'
To which they replied, 'That doesn't matter.'. Then one day, I asked a very senior journalist with whom I was friendly, 'Why are you criticizing our work? We're merely revealing the truth.' His reply is one I'll never forget: 'There is no such thing as truth,' he said. 'Every news item must be judged by the question of whom it serves. And you are serving the enemies of peace.'  Horrified, I retorted, "And you're the one who's considered the reliable journalist, while I'm seen as biased?' So he said, 'If you want to play naive, do it with someone else, not with me. You know I'm right.'
'No,' I said. 'I do not know that you're right. There is such a thing as truth, and it is impartial'

On the English version of Al-Jazeera TV
"If they copy the Arabic version...into English, then they will be committing suicide. Because the whole world will see what role Al Jazeera is playing in making the Muslim world extreme....[On the other hand, if the two channels were to take different stances on global issues, the organization would be] 'speak[ing] from two sides of its mouth'.

Criticism
Journalist Brian Whitaker has accused Carmon of presenting false testimony to Congress when he allegedly misrepresented a Gallup poll. Responding to his charge of having an agenda, Carmon wrote "You are right: we do have an agenda. As an institute of research, we want MEMRI to present translations to people who wish to be informed on the ideas circulating in the Middle East. We aim to reflect reality. If knowledge of this reality should benefit one side or another, then so be it."

Regarding Whitaker's criticism of Carmon's "political background", Carmon responded that:  
"You continually refer to my supposed "political background" as if I had something to hide, and I wonder if I am your real target here. As a civil servant and adviser on counter-terrorism to both Yitzhak Shamir and Yitzhak Rabin, prime ministers from opposing camps, my role was not a political appointment. If your complaint is that I am Israeli, then please say so."

Carmon also questioned Whitaker's own biases, stating that:
I note your website is "Al-Bab", ("The Gateway" in Arabic). Would I be justified in concluding that you are not, in fact, completely neutral about the Middle East, even though you are Middle East editor of a national newspaper? I wonder how you would judge an editor whose website was called "Ha-Sha-ar" ("The Gateway" in Hebrew)?

Whilst not addressing this counterargument, Whitaker re-asserted his points about the misrepresentation of relevant Gallup poll.

Published works
A Pessimist's View of the Peace Process
Osama vs. Bush on Osama bin Laden and the 2004 US Election
Madrid Bluff? March 11, 2004 Madrid bombings NOT al Qaeda

References

1946 births
Arabic–English translators
Israeli Jews
Living people
Zionists
Hebrew University of Jerusalem alumni
Romanian emigrants to Israel
Israeli soldiers
People of the Military Intelligence Directorate (Israel)
People from Hadera
Israeli colonels
Israeli spies